Jose Alves dos Santos Júnior (born July 29, 1969), known as just Júnior, is a former Brazilian football player.

Club statistics

References

External links

1969 births
Living people
Brazilian footballers
Brazilian expatriate footballers
J1 League players
Expatriate footballers in Japan
Expatriate footballers in Portugal
América Futebol Clube (MG) players
Fluminense FC players
Clube Náutico Capibaribe players
Shonan Bellmare players
S.C. Beira-Mar players
Association football defenders